John III of Chalon-Arlay (died 1418) was a French nobleman and a member of the House of Chalon-Arlay.  He was the son of  Louis I lord of Arguel, and the heir of his uncle, Louis's brother, Hugh II lord of Arlay from whom he inherited Arlay.

He married Mary of Baux-Orange, who was the heiress of the Principality of Orange.  John thus became Prince  of Orange.  John and Mary were the parents of
 Louis II lord of Arlay.
  Jean de Chalon, sire de Vitteaux (d. 1462)
 Hugues de Chalon, sire de Cuiseaux (d. 1426 s.p.)
 Alix de Chalon, dame de Bussy (d. 1457)
 Marie de Chalon, dame de Cerlier (d. 1465)

References

Sources

Chalon-Arlay
Princes of Orange
1418 deaths